Mzee Jedi Shemsu Jehewty, also known as Jacob Hudson Carruthers, Jr. (February 15, 1930 in Dallas, Texas – January 4, 2004 in Chicago) was an African-centered historian and educator.

Early Days and Education 
Jacob Carruthers was born in and grew up in Texas and attended school at Phyllis Wheatley High School in Houston, TX, before going to Samuel Huston College where he earned a B.A in 1950. In 1951 he joined the United States Air Force (USAF) and after serving in USAF he enrolled for and earned a master's degree in government from Texas Southern University in 1958. Carruthers then went on to become the first Afrikan-American student to complete a doctorate in Political Studies from the University of Colorado in 1966.

From 1961 to 1964 Carruthers taught Political Science at Prairie View College in Texas and later he taught at Kansas State College in Pittsburg, Kan.

Moving to Chicago and the Center for Inner City Studies 
After two years of teaching Political Science at Kansas State College (1966-1968), Carruthers moved to Chicago where he would live and work for the rest of his life. In 1968 Carruthers joined the Center for Inner City Studies of Northeastern Illinois University (NEIU). For the next thirty-two years Carruthers taught history and education at the Center for Inner City Studies, playing a critical role in the development of the graduate and undergraduate degrees in the Department of Inner City Studies Education (ICSE).

The context created by the work of Inner City Studies with such formidable minds as Anderson Thompson, Robert Starks, and Conrad Worrill would lead to the development of the Afrikan-Centered intellectual movement that would eventually be known as the Chicago School of African-Centered Thought. Several Afrikan-Centered institutions would come out of this movement, the major ones of which Carruthers would be a driving force.

Visiting Cheikh Anta Diop 

In 1975, one year after Cheikh Anta Diop, the famous Afrikan scholar-scientist and his protégé and colleague Théophile Obenga successfully defended the Afrikan origin of ancient Kemet at the UNESCO symposium in Cairo, Jacob Carruthers visited Diop in Senegal. At this visit, Ifé Carruthers writes:

Diop impressed upon Dr. Carruthers the importance of the study of ancient Egypt and more importantly the need to center that study around the command of the Egyptian languages, commonly called hieroglyphics.

Returning from this meeting Carruthers set about helping to establish the organisational base to centralise Kush and Kemet as the classical Afrikan civilisations upon which liberated Afrikan institutions would be built. Carruthers heeded the advice of Diop and immediately threw himself towards the task of learning the ancient language of Kemet, Mdw Ntr, so as to have a direct access to the ancient sources, while urging others to do likewise as a matter of urgency. This led to the establishment of several key Afrikan-centered study group movements.

The Kemetic Institute and ASCAC 
With a solid grounding in the understanding of the cultural unity of Afrika and a command in the classical Afrikan language, Carruthers became instrumental, among a team of other Afrikan-centered scholars, in creating an Afrikan-centered context for the systematic studying of Afrikan history with the objective of raising Afrikan institutions from the rescued knowledge.

In 1978 Carruthers and the African-centered research team composed of A. Josef Ben Levi, Anderson Thompson and Conrad Worrill founded the Kemetic Institute. This organization was born to address the need for serious restoration-driven search by Afrikans on the Classical Afrikan civilizations of Kush and Kemet. Carruthers, as the founding director of the Institute, consistently clarified that the institution was to serve as the springboard for Afrikan-centered institution building by proving the knowledge-base from which other institutions could be nourished.

In February 1984, Carruthers along with John Henrik Clark, Asa Grant Hilliard, Leonard Jeffries, Yosef Ben-Jochannan and Maulana Karenga founded the Association for the Study of Classical African Civilizations (ASCAC) at the First Annual Ancient Egyptian Studies Conference in Los Angeles, California, of which Carruthers was elected the first president.

Personal life 
Carruther was married to Mama Ifé Carruthers with whom he had three sons, Jacob III, Darnell and Christopher, and a daughter, Tawakalitu Jogunosimi.

Death 
Jacob Carruthers died on January 4, 2004, of pancreatic cancer in his Chicago home at the age of 73.

Bibliography 

Intellectual warfare Third World Press. 1999. 

With Maulana Karenga (ed) 1986. Kemet and the African Worldview: Research, Rescue and Restoration. University of Sankore Press.

References

External links
 Bibliography of work
 African Within

1930 births
2004 deaths
American pan-Africanists
African-American academics
20th-century African-American people
21st-century African-American people